
List of notable guerrilla activists, ordered by country:



A

Afghanistan
Ahmad Massoud – son of Ahmed Shah Massoud
Ahmed Shah Massoud
Abdul Haq
Wazir Akbar Khan
Gulbuddin Hekmatyar
Ismail Khan
Mohammed Omar
Osama Bin Laden
Jalaluddin Haqqani

Albania
Enver Hoxha
Lekë Dukagjini
Skanderbeg

Algeria
Abdel Kadir
Saadi Yacef
Ali La Pointe

Angola
Jonas Savimbi

Argentina
 Enrique Gorriarán Merlo
 Che Guevara

Assyria
Malik Khoshaba
Dawid Mar Shimun
Agha Petros
Shimun XIX Benyamin

Austria
Andreas Hofer
Otto Skorzeny - involved in many unconventional operations in World War II

B

Bangladesh
Kader Siddique in Tangail
Hemayet Uddin in Faridpur
Abdul Mannan Bhuiyan in Narsingdi

Belgium
Jacob Collaert - Flemish admiral who served as a privateer and one of the Dunkirkers in Spanish Habsburg service during the Dutch Revolt.

Bolivia
Tamara Bunke in Ñancahuazú
Che Guevara in Ñancahuazú
Osvaldo Peredo in Teoponte

Brazil
Anita Garibaldi
Carlos Marighella
Giuseppe Garibaldi

Bulgaria
Kaloyan

C

Cambodia
Pol Pot

Cameroon
 Osende Afana
 Félix Moumié
 Ernest Ouandié
 Ruben Um Nyobé

Canada
North-West Rebellion
Fine-Day
Gabriel Dumont
Louis Riel
Wandering Spirit
Other
"Yank" Levy
Charles Deschamps de Boishébert et de Raffetot - Quebec born member of the Compagnies Franches de la Marine who was a leader of the Acadian militia in their resistance to the Expulsion of the Acadians.
Sébastien Rale
Joseph Broussard - also went by the pseudonym Beausoleil.

Chad
Goukouni Oueddei
Hissène Habré
Ibrahim Abatcha
Idriss Déby
Rabih az-Zubayr
Youssouf Togoïmi

Chechnya
Aslan Maskhadov
Dzhokhar Dudayev
Akhmed Zakayev
Zelimkhan Yandarbiyev
Imam Shamil in Daghestan
Amir Ibn al-Khattab
Sheikh Abdul Halim
Shamil Basayev

Chile
Galvarino Apablaza
Manuel Rodríguez Erdoíza
Miguel Enríquez
José Gregorio Liendo, Neltume
Raúl Pellegrin

China
Sun Tzu - ancient Chinese general and military strategist who authored The Art of War
Mao Zedong
Zhou Enlai
Sun Yat-sen
Bai Chongxi
Chiang Kai-shek
Gan Ning
Cao Cao
Zang Ba

Colombia
Jacobo Arenas
Manuel Marulanda
Camilo Torres

Cuba
Fidel Castro
Camilo Cienfuegos
Che Guevara
Antonio Maceo

Cyprus
Georgios Grivas

D

Democratic Republic of the Congo
Laurent-Désiré Kabila
Laurent Nkunda
Pierre Mulele

Dominican Republic
Ramón Natera
Gregorio Urbano Gilbert

E

Egypt
Inaros - (Egyptian rebel ruler) together with Athenian allies fought for a year and a half in the marshes in north Egypt against Persians.

El Salvador
Farabundo Martí
Schafik Handal
Cayetano Carpio (Comandante Marcial)
Joaquín Villalobos
Ana María

Eritrea
 Isaias Afewerki
 Hamid Idris Awate
 Woldeab Woldemariam

Estonia
 Alfred Käärmann
 Rummu Jüri
 August Sabbe
 Ülo Voitka

Ethiopia
Hayelom Araya
Kinfe Gebremedhin
Meles Zenawi
Siye Abraha
Debretsion Gebremichael

F

Finland
Paavali Halonen
Lauri Törni
Pekka Vesainen

France
François le Clerc - 16th-century French privateer known as "Jambe de Bois" (Peg Leg) who is credited as the first pirate in the modern era to have a "peg leg".
Bertrand du Guesclin
Charles Deschamps de Boishébert et de Raffetot - Quebec born member of the Compagnies Franches de la Marine who was a leader of the Acadian militia in the resistance to the Expulsion of the Acadians.
Sébastien Rale
Jean-Louis Le Loutre
Pierre Georges - member of the French Communist Party during World War II
Charles de Gaulle
Nancy Wake
Georges Cadoudal
Joseph Epstein
Jean-Baptiste du Casse
Jean Fleury
Jean Ango
Jeanne de Clisson

Frisia
Pier Gerlofs Donia
Wijerd Jelckama

G

Germany
Arminius - Germanic chieftain who orchestrated the legendary ambush against the Romans at the Battle of the Teutoburg Forest.
Klein Henszlein - German pirate from 1560 to 1573 who raided shipping in the North Sea
Paul von Lettow-Vorbeck
Thomas Müntzer
Otto Skorzeny - Austrian elite operative who conducted unconventional operations in World War II for Nazi Germany
Franz von Rintelen
Johann Ewald
Carl von Clausewitz
Felix von Luckner

Greece
Athanasios Diakos
Geórgios Karaïskákis
Manolis Glezos
Markos Botsaris
Odysseas Androutsos
Theodoros Kolokotronis
Antonis Vratsanos
Daskalogiannis

Guatemala
 Rodrigo Asturias
 Comandante Rolando Morán

Guinea
Samory Touré

H

Haiti
 Charlemagne Péralte
 Toussaint L'ouverture
 Francois Mackandal
 Vincent Oge
 Jean-Bertrand Aristide
 Jean-Jacques Dessalines
 Francois Capois
 Henri Christophe
 Sans-Souci
 Dutty Boukman

I

Republic of India
Shivaji Maharaj
 Kerala Varma Pazhassi Raja in Kerala
Sangolli Rayanna in Karnataka
Komaram Bheem in Andhra Pradesh
Alluri Sita Rama Raju in Andhra Pradesh
Malik Ambar
Patel Sudhakar Reddy
Sardar Muhammad Ibrahim Khan
Sayeed Salahudeen
Yasin Malik

Indonesia
General Sudirman - military commander of Republican Indonesian forces during Indonesia's fight for independence from the Dutch in the 1940s
Abdul Haris Nasution

Iran
Babak Khorramdin
Hassan-i Sabbah
Ismail I
Mostafa Chamran
Massoud Rajavi

Iraq
Saladin
Abu Musab al-Zarqawi
Abu Ayyub al-Masri
Muqtada al-Sadr
Zayd ibn Ali
Abu Omar al-Baghdadi
Abu Muslim
Abu Azrael

Ireland

Irish Republican
Michael Collins - Irish Republican Army guerrilla leader during British rule of Ireland
Tom Barry
Gerry Adams - suspected Provisional IRA Army Council member
Martin McGuinness - suspected Provisional IRA Army Council member
Seamus Costello - Official IRA member
Stakeknife - senior Provisional IRA member and British government informant, alleged to be Freddie Scappaticci
Bobby Sands - Provisional IRA member and hunger striker
Francis Hughes - Provisional IRA member and later hunger striker
Dominic McGlinchey - Provisional IRA and later INLA leader
Frank Aiken

Ulster Loyalist
Billy Wright - Loyalist Volunteer Force (LVF) leader
John Gregg - senior Ulster Defence Association (UDA) member, attempted to assassinate Gerry Adams
Johnny Adair - aka "Mad Dog", UDA commander
Lenny Murphy - notorious Ulster Loyalist operative who led the Shankill Butchers

Israel
Menahem ben Judah - leader of the Sicarri
Judas Maccabeus - Jewish priest who led the Maccabean Revolt against the Seleucid Empire (167-160 BCE)
Avraham Stern
Menachem Begin
Yitzhak Shamir
Yohai Ben-Nun
Haim Bar-Lev
Aharon Davidi
Yekutiel Adam - a member of the Haganah that conducted raids into enemy territory.
Ehud Barak - took part in a commando guerrilla like but controversial raid in Lebanon.
Yonatan Netanyahu 
Ze'ev Almog
Ami Ayalon
Ariel Sharon - member of the Haganah. His unit in the Haganah conducted hit-and-run raids on enemy forces. He was also a member of the controversial guerrilla/commando like group known as Unit 101 which had been scrutinized and condemned for some of its operations. 
Danny Matt
Mordechai Gur
Rafael Eitan

Italy
Spartacus
Quintus Fabius Maximus Verrucosus
Giuseppe Garibaldi
Giuseppe Mazzini
Carmine Crocco
Ninco Nanco
Licio Visintini - decorated Italian naval officer who conducted unconventional amphibious warfare like missions against allied shipping in World War II

J

Japan
Genpei War
Yoritomo
Minamoto no Yoshitsune
Minamoto no Noriyori
Minamoto no Yoritomo
Yoshinaka
Minamoto no Yoshinaka
Minamoto no Yukiie
Taira clan
Taira no Kiyomori
Genkō War
Kusunoki Masashige
Boshin War
Tatsumi Naofumi
Hosoya Jūdayū
Hayashi Tadataka
World War II
Tadamichi Kuribayashi
Hiroo Onoda
Other
Fūma Kotarō
Tateoka Doshun
Ōishi Yoshio
Mochizuki Chiyome
Tsuneo Mori

K

Korea
Japanese invasions of Korea (1592–1598)
Gwak Jae-u
Hyujeong
Jo Heon
Japanese colonial rule of Korea
Ji Cheong-cheon
Lee Beom-seok
Kim Won-bong
Kim Hong-il
Kim Il Sung
Kim Chwa-chin
Yun Hui-sun
Others
Choe Ik-hyeon
Shin Dol-seok

Kosovo
Adem Jashari
Ramush Haradinaj
Agim Ceku
Agim Ramadani
Sali Çekaj
Hamëz Jashari
Bekim Berisha
Luan Haradinaj
Daut Haradinaj

Kenya
Dedan Kimathi
Waruhiu Itote
Musa Mwariama

Kurdistan
Saladin
Mahmud Barzanji
Mahmoud Ezidi
Jalal Talabani
Nawshirwan Mustafa
Najmadin Shukr Rauf
Abdul Rahman Ghassemlou
Sadegh Sharafkandi

L

Laos
General Vang Pao in Kingdom of Laos
Pa Chay Vue
Ong Kommandan
Ong Keo

Latvia
Pēteris Dzelzītis - Latvian soldier during World War II

Lebanon
Hassan Nasrallah

Lesotho
Ntsu Mokhehle

Liberia
Charles Taylor
Prince Johnson

Libya
Omar Mukhtar

Lithuania
Jonas Žemaitis
Adolfas Ramanauskas
Juozas Lukša

M

Malaysia
Mahathir Mohamad

Mexico
Subcomandante Marcos of the Zapatista Army of National Liberation in Chiapas, Mexico
Pancho Villa of the Mexican Revolution.
Emiliano Zapata of the Mexican Revolution.
Lucio Cabañas
 Miguel Hidalgo of the Mexican War of Independence.
 Davy Crockett of the Texas Revolution, died at the Fall of the Alamo.
 Sam Houston of the Texas Revolution.
 William Barret Travis of the Texas Revolution, died at the Fall of the Alamo.
 Juan Seguín of the Texas Revolution.
 James Bowie of the Texas Revolution, died at the Fall of the Alamo.
 James Fannin of the Texas Revolution, murdered in the Goliad Massacre.
 Victorio: Apache chief and warlord, active in both Mexico and the United States. Apache Wars.
 Geronimo of the Apache Wars, active in both Mexico and the United States.
 Bernardo Reyes, warlord during the Mexican Revolution.
 Francisco I. Madero, revolutionary general during the Mexican Revolution.

Mongolia
Genghis Khan
Tolui
Jebe
Subutai

Morocco
Abd el-Krim
Mouha ou Hammou Zayani
Mohammed Ameziane

Mozambique
Afonso Dhlakama
André Matsangaissa
Eduardo Mondlane
Filipe Samuel Magaia
Samora Machel

Myanmar
Khun Sa
Saya San
Johnny and Luther Htoo

N

Namibia
Jakobus Morenga
Hendrik Witbooi

Nepal
Prachanda

Netherlands
Pier Gerlofs Donia
Wijerd Jelckama
Abraham Blauvelt
Michiel Andrieszoon - Dutch buccaneer active in the 1680s.
Jan Willems (Dutch buccaneer)
Cornelis Jol
Roche Braziliano

Nicaragua
Adolfo Calero
Arlen Siu
Augusto César Sandino
Daniel Ortega
Dora María Téllez
Edén Pastora (Comandante Cero)
Enrique Bermúdez
Humberto Ortega
Joaquín Cuadra
Nora Astorga
Rigoberto Cruz
Carlos Fonseca

Nigeria
Ateke Tom
Henry Okah
Mujahid Dokubo-Asari
Odumegwu Ojukwu
Philip Effiong

Norway
Martin Linge

P

Pakistan
Ilyas Kashmiri
Osama bin Laden
Malik Munawar Khan Awan
Nauroz Khan
Allah Nazar Baloch
Balach Marri
Sher Mohammad Marri

Palestine
Abd al-Qadir al-Husayni
Yasser Arafat
George Habash
Wadie Haddad 
Abu Nidal
Ahmed Yassin 
Yahya Ayyash
Mohammed Deif 
Ahmad Sa'adat
Abu Ali Mustafa 
Marwan Barghouti
Khalil al-Wazir 
Izz El-Deen Sheikh Khalil
Ali Hassan Salameh 
Zakaria Zubeidi 
Dalal Mughrabi
Leila Khaled
Izz ad-Din al-Qassam
Abdel Aziz al-Rantissi
Omar Rezaq
Sirhan Sirhan
Mahmoud Tawalbe

Peru
Abimael Guzmán (Presidente Gonzalo)
 Tupac Amaru
Héctor Béjar
Hugo Blanco
Andrés Avelino Cáceres
Javier Heraud
Guillermo Lobaton

Philippines

Wendell Fertig
Gabriela Silang
José María Sison
Luis Taruc
Emilio Aguinaldo
Macario Sakay
Andrés Bonifacio
Baldomero Aguinaldo
Gregorio del Pilar
Antonio Luna
Emilio Jacinto
Juan Pajota - Filipino guerrilla leader who played a major role in the Raid at Cabanatuan
Eduardo Joson

Poland
 Feliks Ankerstein
 Dawid Moryc Apfelbaum
 Edmund Charaszkiewicz
 Henryk "Hubal" Dobrzański
 Franciszek Kamiński
 Tadeusz Komorowski
 Józef Kasparek
 Aleksander Józef Lisowski
 Leopold Okulicki
 Witold Pilecki
 Jan Piwnik
 Kazimierz Pużak
 Stefan Rowecki
 Avraham Stern (from Suwałki; backed by the Polish Army in 1938 & 1939)
 Emil August Fieldorf "Nil"
 Joseph Epstein - Polish born activist who fought for the French Resistance in World War II
 Mordechai Anielewicz

Portugal
 Viriathus

R

Romania
Mircea I of Wallachia
 Vlad the Impaler
 Stephen III of Moldavia

Rwanda
Paul Kagame
Fred Rwigyema

S

Saudi Arabia
Ibn Saud
T. E. Lawrence
Muhammad

Scotland
First War of Scottish Independence
William Wallace
Robert I of Scotland
The Black Douglas
Andrew Moray
William the Hardy
Thomas Randolph
Simon Fraser
John Comyn
Second War of Scottish Independence
Andrew Murray
William Douglas
Patrick V
John Randolph
Archibald Douglas
Others
Andrew Barton (privateer) - notorious Scottish sailor who made raids against Portuguese ships.

Serbia
See list of Serbian hajduks
Serbian Revolutionaries (1804–15)
Serbian Chetnik Organization (1903–08)
Chetnik Detachments of the Yugoslav Army (1941–45)

Sierra Leone
Foday Sankoh

Singapore
Lim Bo Seng, Force 136
Tan Chong Tee, Force 136

South Africa
First Boer War
Piet Joubert
Joachim Ferreira
Nicolaas Smit
Schalk Willem Burger
Francois Gerhardus Joubert - Boer commander who ambushed and decimated a British column in the Battle of Bronkhorstspruit
Piet Cronjé
Second Boer War
Louis Botha
Christiaan de Wet
Jan Smuts
Koos de la Rey
Deneys Reitz
Piet Joubert
Martinus Theunis Steyn
Schalk Willem Burger
Piet Cronjé
Christian Frederick Beyers
Pieter Hendrik Kritzinger
Gideon Scheepers
Johannes Lotter
Others
Nelson Mandela
Potlako Leballo
Walter Sisulu
Jacob Zuma
Joe Slovo
Chris Hani

Soviet Union
Mikhail Frunze
Stepniak - Russian radical
Stepan Bandera
Viktor Leonov - Soviet sailor whose experiences as a Soviet Naval Scout would be a precursor to the Russian special operations called the Spetsnaz
Sydir Kovpak
Semyon Rudniev
Vasily Zaitsev - Soviet Sniper who killed 225 enemy soldiers
Serge Obolensky

Spain
Aben Humeya
Abo Hafs Omer Al-Baloty
Juan Guartem - late 17th century Spanish renegade pirate
Francisco Sabate - El Quico, Anarchist maquis fighter killed in 1960
José Miguel Beñaran Ordeñana
Pelagius of Asturias
Umar ibn Hafsun
El Empecinado
Johanne Galan "La Galana"
Francisco Abad Moreno "Chaleco"
Agustina de Aragón
Vicente López Tovar
Viriathus

Sudan
John Garang
Khalil Ibrahim
Muhammad Ahmad
Osman Digna
Rabih az-Zubayr
Sebehr Rahma

Suriname
Ronnie Brunswijk

Syria
Sultan al-Atrash

T

Thailand
See Bang Rachan
Phraya Phichai

Tunisia
Abu 'Abdullah al-Shi'i
Abu Yazid
Hannibal
Mago Barca

Turkey
Şeyh Bedrettin

Uganda
Yoweri Museveni
Alice Auma (Alice Lakwena)
Joseph Kony

Ukraine
Nestor Makhno
Maria Nikiforova

United Kingdom
Glyndŵr Rising
Owain Glyndŵr in Wales
American Revolution
Banastre Tarleton – British Cavalry officer of the British Legion (American Revolution) in the American Revolution
Lieutenant Colonel John Graves Simcoe of the Queen's Rangers in the American Revolution
Christopher Carleton – led raids in the American Revolution
Patrick Ferguson
William Caldwell
Bloody Bill Cunningham
David Fanning
Simon Girty
John Butler
James De Lancey
War of 1812
James FitzGibbon
William Johnson Kerr
Tecumseh – Native-American guerrilla leader who served the British in the War of 1812
Phineas Riall
Adam Muir – Battle of Maguaga
James Gordon
George Cockburn
James Lucas Yeo – conducted 3 raids. The second British raid at Charlotte, New York, at the mouth of the Genesse River (June 15, 1813). Performed the raid at the battle of Fort Oswego. And the raid at Sodus, New York (June 19, 1813)
Cecil Bisshopp
William Caldwell
John Brant
Gordon Drummond
William Mulcaster
Charles de Salaberry
World War I
T. E. Lawrence (Lawrence of Arabia) in Arabia
World War II
David Stirling – Scottish born officer who was the founder of the Special Air Service
Tommy Macpherson – Scottish born British-army officer who conducted guerrilla operations in World War II
Roy Farran – in command of Operations Wallace and Hardy
Orde Wingate – (founder of the Chindits) in Palestine and Burma
Mike Calvert – British soldier nicknamed "Mad Mike" who participated in Chindit operations and was influential in promoting the ideas of unconventional warfare by Orde Wingate.
Jack Churchill – British soldier named "Mad Jack" who fought in World War II armed with a longbow, bagpipes, and a Scottish broadsword.
Ursula Graham Bower – led the Nagas against the Japanese during World War II
Nancy Wake – New Zealand born female operative who joined the Special Operations Executive and participated in operations with the French Resistance in World War II
Virginia Hall – American spy who worked with the Special Operations Executive in the European theatre of World War II before joining the American Office of Strategic Services.
Fitzroy Maclean worked with Tito and Yugoslav Partisans during World War II
Ivan Lyon – member of the Z Special Unit
Robert Grainger Ker Thompson – famous British military officer and counter-insurgency expert who served in the Burma Campaign
Carol Mather
John Durnford-Slater
Malayan Emergency
Robert Grainger Ker Thompson – famous British military officer and counter-insurgency expert
Other
Henry Mainwaring – nicknamed "The Dread Pirate".
Edward Davis (buccaneer) – English buccaneer active in the Caribbean during the 1680s.
William Kyd – 15th-century English pirate active in Southwest England from the 1430s until the 1450s.
John Nutt – notorious 17th-century English pirate who raided the coasts of Southern Canada and Western England for over three years before his capture.
Henry Jennings – 18th-century English privateer from the colony of Bermuda
Samuel Bellamy – "Black Bellamy"
Howell Davis – Welsh pirate
Charles Bellamy – English pirate raided colonial American shipping in New England and later off the coast of Canada.
William Dampier
Blackbeard – one of the most notorious pirates from England
James Alday
John Bear (pirate)
William Rous
William Parker
Dick Turpin

United States
French and Indian War
Kingdom of Great Britain, British America, and Native American allies
John Stark
John Armstrong Sr.
Eyre Massey
Sayenqueraghta
Robert Rogers
Daniel Morgan
Kingdom of France, New France, and Native American allies
Jean Erdman
Francois-Marie
Daniel Lienard de Beaujeu
Jean-Daniel Dumas
Charles Michel de Langlade
Pontiac
Revolutionary War
George Washington
John Parker
Benjamin Cleveland
Elijah Clarke
John Sevier
Ethan Allen
William Campbell
Francis Marion
Andrew Pickens
Thomas Sumter
Samuel Whittemore
William Richardson Davie
James Williams
Isaac Shelby
John Schenck
William Russell
Andrew Jackson
Philemon Dickinson
William Moultrie
John Sullivan
Seth Warner
Marinus Willett
Nathanael Greene
Daniel Morgan
Return J. Meigs Sr.
William Barton
John Glover
Edward Hand
William Maxwell – American Continental general whose guerrilla actions are notable in the Forage War, Battle of Cooch's Bridge, and Battle of Connecticut Farms.
Henry Lee III
Allan McLane
Benjamin Tallmadge
William Washington
David Wooster
Timothy Murphy – his exploits of guerrilla-like actions are shown in What Manner of Men: Forgotten Heroes of the American Revolution by Fred J. Cook in Chapter III
Thomas Knowlton
John Stark
Anthony Wayne – led a famous surprise night attack in the Battle of Stony Point.
Adam Hyler – German who immigrated to America and became a privateer harassing the British fleet by destroying ships, capturing crews, and conducting raids.
George Wait Babcock
Jeremiah O'Brien – led the first American attack in the Raid on St. John (1775)
Gustavus Conyngham – Irish-born American officer in the continental navy and a privateer who has been called "the most successful of all Continental Navy Captains."
John Rathbun – officer in the Continental Navy whose most well known exploit was his own raid at Nassau. Not to be confused with the first Raid of Nassau
John Barry
Herbert Woodbury
Noah Stoddard
John Paul Jones
Jonathan Haraden – his unconventional type of warfare at sea are mentioned in What Manner of Men: Forgotten Heroes of the American Revolution by Fred J. Cook in chapter IX.
Nicholas Biddle
Joshua Barney
David Hawley
Morgan's Riflemen
Whitcomb's Rangers
1st Continental Light Dragoons
2nd Continental Light Dragoons
Lee's Legion
American militia
American Privateers
Northwest Indian War
United States
Charles Scott
James Wilkinson
John Hardin
Benjamin Logan
William Wells
Native Americans
Little Turtle
Buckongahelas
Egushawa
Blue Jacket
Quasi-War
Silas Talbot
Isaac Hull
Daniel Carmick
Stephen Decatur Sr.
Benjamin Stoddert
David Porter
First Barbary War
John Rodgers
Andrew Sterett
Lewis Heermann
Stephen Decatur
Thomas Macdonough
William Eaton
War of 1812
Andrew Jackson
Alexander Macomb
Benjamin Forsyth
Daniel Appling
Lodowick Morgan
Bennet C. Riley
Alexander Smyth
Jacob Brown
Peter B. Porter
John Coffee
Philip Reed
Azariah C. Flagg
Richard Mentor Johnson
Ninian Edwards
Davy Crockett
Caleb Hopkins
Joseph Bartholomew
John Tipton
John Ketcham
William Dudley
Nathan Boone
Thomas Hinds
Buckner F. Harris
Lewis Cass
Samuel Dale
John Williams
John Alexander Cocke
William Whitley
John Swift
Benjamin Mooers
Benjamin Howard
John Floyd
Isaac Shelby
Guilford Dudley Young
Elisah Griffen
Richard Lawson
Joseph Willcocks
Abraham Markle
William McIntosh
Pushmataha
Red Jacket
Isaac Clark
George McGlassin
James Miller
George Croghan
George Edward Mitchell
William Russell
William Orlando Butler
John E. Wool
John Miller
James Wilkinson
Nathaniel Towson
John B. Campbell
William Henry Harrison
Duncan McArthur
Andrew Holmes
Daniel Bissell – American general who used the cover of the woods and tactical maneuvers to successfully raid/destroy the enemy grain and flower in the Battle of Cook's Mills.
William Pinkney – commanded American riflemen who concealed themselves by the shrubbery on the low ground near the river at Bladensburg bridge. Pinckney's concealed riflemen poured deadly volleys into exposed masses of British troops crossing the bridge. This is mentioned in Harper's New Monthly Magazine, Volume 28 edited by Henry Mills Alden page 439. This is also confirmed in a well documented history book Lossing's War of 1812: Lossing’s Pictorial Field Book of the War of 1812 written by Benson Lossing Chapter XXXIX.
Regiment of Riflemen
United States Rangers
Indiana Rangers
1st Regiment of Light Dragoons
2nd Regiment of Light Dragoons
Canadian Volunteers
American Militia
American Privateers
Isaac Chauncey
Melancthon Taylor Woolsey
Johnston Blakeley
Arthur Sinclair
Daniel Turner
William Henry Allen
Stephen Decatur
Charles Stewart
David Porter
John Percival
Francis Gregory
Jesse Elliot
Joseph Tarbell – conducted a hit-and-run night attack on the British navy with gunboats and riflemen with mixed or limited results. This is mentioned in the history book The Encyclopedia of the War of 1812: A Political, Social, and Military History by Spencer C. Tucker page 123.
William Josephus Stafford
James Kirker
Joshua Hailey
George R. Roberts
Thomas Boyle
James DeWolf
Joshua Barney
Otway Burns
Bill Johnston – Canadian amphibious guerrilla/pirate who fought for the American side.
John Ordronaux – very successful French-born privateer who preyed on British merchant ships, outran about seventeen British warships, and brought back to the US goods worth $250,000 and $300,000.
J. Rowland – raided British shipping and vessels
Clement Cathell
James Barnes
Samuel Barstow
George W. Burbank
Nathanial Shaler
Texas Revolution
American volunteers, Texan Revolutionaries, and allies
Sam Houston
William B. Travis – commander of the Texans at the Fall of the Alamo.
James Bowie
Davy Crockett – famous frontiersmen, fought and died at the Fall of the Alamo.
Amon B. King – Battle of Refugio
Ira Westover
William Ward
Richard Andrews
Noah Smithwick
Deaf Smith
John Coker
Moses Lapham
Moseley Baker
Frank W. Johnson
James Grant
Mirabeau B. Lamar
Juan Seguín
Manuel N. Flores
Plácido Benavides
John Henry Moore
Mexico
José de Urrea
Carlos de la Garza
Manuel Fernández Castrillón – used his fellow Mexican marksmen to snipe and harass the Texan insurgents in the Siege of Béxar. Mentioned in Texian Iliad: A Military History of the Texas Revolution by Stephen L. Hardin in Chapter 5.
Rafael Pretalia
Seminole Wars
United States of America
William S. Harney
Bennet C. Riley
Joseph Marion Hernandez – commanded an American force that made two successful stealthy raids/assaults on the Seminoles. Mentioned in History of the Second Seminole war, 1835–1842 by John K. Mahon pages 211-214
Andrew Jackson – disguised his ship with a British flag to lure Hillis Hadjo into a trap and successful capture.
Gabriel J. Rains
Seminoles and their allies
Micanopy
Osceola – Native American freedom fighter
Thlocklo Tustenuggee
Billy Bowlegs
Ar-pi-uck-i – Seminole guerrilla leader who used cover, concealment, and evasive tactics in Lake Okeechobee, Loxahtchee, and Pine Island Ridge
John Horse
Hillis Hadjo
Mexican–American War
United States of America
Fabius Stanly – American naval lieutenant who led raids against the Mexican armed forces.
Joseph Lane – United States Army American general who led a hit and run surprise attack on the Mexican armed forces at the Skirmish at Matamoros
John Coffee Hays – Hay's well planned ambush mentioned in Mixed Blessing: the Role of the Texas Rangers in the Mexican War, 1846–1848 written by Ian B. Lyles, pages 43–44
Samuel Hamilton Walker
Albert G. Blanchard – feigned retreat luring the Mexicans into John Coffee Hays' ambush in Mixed Blessing: the Role of the Texas Rangers in the Mexican War, 1846–1848 written by Ian B. Lyles, pages 43–44
Ezekiel "Stuttering Zeke" Merritt – conducted a hit-and-run raid capturing 170 horses. Mentioned in historic book Bear Flag Lieutenant: The Life Story of Henry L. Ford [1822-1860] written by Fred Blackburn Rogers page 263.
William B. Ide
Henry Ford – conducted 3 incursions/raids on enemy houses/bases destroying enemy weapons, capturing prisoners, and rescuing hostages before returning to friendly lines. Mentioned in Bear Flag Lieutenant: The Life Story of Henry L. Ford (1822–1860) written by Fred Blackburn Rogers pages 268–270.
Benjamin McCulloch
John C. Fremont
Tunis Craven
Mexico
Joaquín Rea
Antonio Canales Rosillo
Jose Mariano Salas – Mexican commander who commanded Mexican partisans called "Guerrillas of Vengeance" which is mentioned in the history book "U.S. Army Campaigns of the Mexican War" page 15.
Celedonio Dómeco de Jarauta
José Antonio Carrillo
José María Flores
Manuel Pineda Munoz – commanded Mexican forces that used guerrilla tactics in the Battle of Mulegé
Utah War
Lot Smith
Daniel H. Wells
Brigham Young
Isaac C. Haight
John D. Lee
Civil War
Confederacy
Bloody Bill Anderson
Champ Ferguson
William Quantrill
Dan Showalter
John Singleton Mosby
John Hunt Morgan
John Hanson McNeill – led an independent irregular Confederate military company called McNeill's Rangers commissioned under the Partisan Ranger Act
Earl Van Dorn
Adam Rankin Johnson – gained notoriety for his incursion known as the Newburgh Raid where he gained the nickname "Stovepipe Johnson"
Archie Clement
Joseph C. Porter – Confederate officer who was a key leader in the guerrilla campaigns in northern Missouri
John Mobberly
Jack Hinson – Confederate partisan sniper
John Jackson Dickison – at times called by scholars or historians as "the Swamp Fox of the Confederacy" or "the Confederate Swamp Fox"
William McWaters – Confederate guerrilla who with his fellow bushwackers conducted a successful but controversial sabotage mission known as the Platte Bridge Railroad Tragedy
Joseph Wheeler
Jubal Early
J. E. B. Stuart
Harry Gilmor
Earl Van Dorn
Mary Jane Green
Wade Hampton III
Richard Montgomery Gano
Stand Watie
James Iredell Waddell
Raphael Semmes
Union
John Brown
Charles R. Jennison
James H. Lane
Daniel R. Anthony
Newton Knight
Owen Brown
Benjamin Grierson
William B. Cushing
Samuel C. Means – captain of the Loudoun Rangers
Henry Young
Harriet Tubman – female African American who infiltrated slave territory bringing slaves to safe zones, played a major role in the Raid on Combahee Ferry, and provided critical intelligence to the Union.
James Montgomery – Union Jayhawker who was in command of the Union forces in the Raid on Combahee Ferry and conducted other raids against the confederates.
Henry Baxter
James J. Andrews
Abel Streight
Hugh Judson Kilpatrick
Gouverneur K. Warren – Union Army general who executed a deadly ambush in the Battle of Bristoe Station
William Henry Powell
William W. Averell
Samuel P. Carter
George W. Taylor
Samuel P. Cox
George Stoneman
James H. Wilson
Thomas R. Kerr
John R. Kelso – his exploits of covert guerilla-like actions are mentioned in his book Bloody Engagements: John R. Kelso's Civil War written by himself.
Ishmael Day
Theophilus Lyle Dickey
James Madison Wells
Malinda Blalock
Daniel Ellis
Fielding Hurst
Christopher Haun
Edward E. Potter
Seth Ledyard Phelps
Opothleyahola
William Sloan Tough
Powder River Expedition (1865)
United States
Patrick E. Connor – American brigadier general who led a surprise raid-like incursion in the Battle of the Tongue River; the incursion has had some controversy and debate.
Jim Bridger – army scout alongside Frank North who scouted and discovered the Arapaho village allowing Patrick E. Connor to make his controversial surprise attack in the Battle of the Tongue River
Frank North – led a successful dawn surprise-like attack with his Pawnee Scouts on the Cheyenne which became known as the Powder River Massacre which also might have some controversy or debate.
Native Americans
Red Cloud – very important leader of the Oglala Lakota people.
Dull Knife – great chief of the Cheyenne who alongside Red Cloud harassed the Americans at the Battle of Bone Pile Creek.
Sitting Bull
Roman Nose – alongside Sitting Bull led the Native Americans in ambushing, harassing, and skirmishing against the U.S. armed forces in the Powder River Battles
Snake War
United States
George Crook
Billy Chinook – chief and member of the Wasco tribe and served the United States as a First Sergeant of the U.S. Army Wasco Scouts
Native Americans
Paulina (Paiute leader)
Wahveveh
Great Sioux War of 1876
United States
Ranald S. Mackenzie
George Crook
Frank North – organized and commanded the Pawnee Scouts
Wesley Merritt – planned an ambush which let to little to no high body count in the Battle of Warbonnet Creek
Native Americans
Crazy Horse
Sitting Bull
Little Wolf
American Horse (elder)
Apache Wars
United States
George Crook
George Morton Randall – American Captain who led a well coordinated surprise attack on the Apache and their allies in the Battle of Turret Peak.
James Henry Tevis – pioneer who led a militia of 30 men in a surprise attack on the Apache in the Battle of the Mimbres River
James H. Whitlock – Battle of Mount Gray
Al Sieber
Howard B. Cushing
Nantaje
Apache and their allies
Flechas Rayada
Mangas Coloradas – Apache tribal chief who led raids and ambushes against the Mexicans and Americans
Cochise – chief or leader of the Chokonen band of the Chiricahua Apache who also led raids and ambushes against the Mexicans and Americans
Victorio
Nana (chief)
Chato (Apache)
Juh
Baishan (Apache)
Geronimo – Native American freedom fighter
Philippine–American War
Frederick Funston – American brigadier general who planned, led, and executed the raid that captured Emilio Aguinaldo.
United States Armed Forces – led a rear surprise attack/ambush decimating an army of would be ambushers in the Battle of Lonoy
Elwell Stephen Otis – American commander of a hit-and-run raid-like mission that successfully destroyed a Filipino artillery gun in the Battle of Olongapo
Hiram I. Bearss
World War 1
Theodore Roosevelt Jr. – planned and ordered a successful raid at Cantigny that captured 33 prisoners and documents with intelligence. This is mentioned in Infantry in Battle by Charles T. Lanham, pages 43–47
Michael Valente
John L. Barkley – his exploit of surprising/ambushing and decimating an army of Germans are mentioned in his memoir written by himself and an article One Man’s Ambush written by Edward G. Lengel
Hiram I. Bearss
United States occupation of the Dominican Republic
James P. Parker
Richard Wainwright – was in command of a commando amphibious raid in the Santo Domingo Affair
Ernest Calvin Williams – American marine who led a commando like assault in the Battle of San Francisco de Macoris
Albert S. Mclemore
United States occupation of Nicaragua
Chesty Puller
Harold C. Roberts – surprised bandits, used fire and maneuver tactics including use of cover, and attempted an ambush.
Evans Carlson
Merritt Edson
Wilburt S. Brown
United States occupation of Haiti
Herman H. Hanneken
William Robert Button
Chesty Puller
Gerald C. Thomas
Smedley Butler
Ross Lindsey Iams – took part with Samuel Gross in Smedley Butler's surprise raid like commando assault in the Battle of Fort Rivière
Samuel Gross
World War II
Aaron Bank – famous officer of the Office of Strategic Services who is considered the founder of the United States Army Special Forces also known as the "Green Berets".
Donald Blackburn – American advisor to the Philippine Commonwealth Army who conducted a guerrilla insurgency on the island of Luzon against the Japanese.
James M. Cushing
Evans Carlson – commander of the Marine Raiders whose notable unconventional warfare type of successes were the Raid on Makin Island and the Carlson's patrol.
William Orlando Darby – United States Army officer who led the famous "Darby's Rangers" which would evolve into the U.S. Army Rangers.
Joseph Beyrle – American paratrooper who conducted his own sabotage like warfare behind German lines before fighting alongside the Red Army after escaping German captivity a few times.
Merritt Edson
Carl F. Eifler
Wendell Fertig – American civil engineer who organized and commanded an America-Filipino guerrilla army on the Japanese – occupied, southern Philippine island of Mindanao.
Roger Hilsman – American who served in the Merrill's Marauders and then with the Office of Strategic Services as a guerrilla leader in the China Burma India Theater of World War II
Virginia Hall – American female spy who worked as an agent for the American Office of Strategic Services in Europe after previously working for the British Special Operations Executive.
William R. Peers
Russell W. Volckmann – United States Army infantry officer and a leader of the guerrilla resistance in the Philippines and considered a co-founder of the United States Army Special Forces
Hugh B. Miller – U.S. naval officer stranded on an island who systematically ambushed and attacked Japanese soldiers with just hand grenades and a bayonet.
Robert Prince – American officer in the U.S. Army's 6th Ranger Battalion who was the main architect of the plan for the Raid at Cabanatuan.
Henry Mucci – colonel of United States Army Rangers who led the Raid at Cabanatuan with Robert Prince as the planner of the mission.
Peter J. Ortiz
Ray C. Hunt
Victor H. Krulak
Edwin Ramsey
Iliff David Richardson
Arthur W. Wermuth
Robert Lapham
Jack Hendrick Taylor – sometimes considered or referred to as the "first Navy SEAL".
Richard Winters – took part in an ambush against a German horse drawn supply convoy. Mentioned in Band of Brothers: E Company, 506th Regiment, 101st Airborne, from Normandy to Hitler's Eagle's Nest written by Stephen E. Ambrose page 91. Also mentioned in Brothers in Battle, Best of Friends written by Dick Hill pages 62–64. Conducted a commando-like hit-and-run raid destroying four artillery guns successfully in the Brécourt Manor Assault. And successfully ambushed and wiped out a 7-man German machine gun crew at another battle. Mentioned in Beyond Band of Brothers: The War Memoirs of Major Dick Winters written by Dick Winters pages 137–138.
William Guarnere
Chick Parsons
Arthur D. Simons
Samuel V. Wilson
Vincent R. Kramer
Clyde A. Thomason
Jack Hawkins
John H. Yancey
Oscar F. Peatross
Robert Halperin
Elizabeth Peet McIntosh
Serge Obolensky
Walter R. Mansfield
Korean War
Donald Nichols
Merrill Newman
Colt Terry – whose experience of unconventional warfare in the Korean War before becoming a Green Beret are shown in Colt Terry, Green Beret written by Charles D. Patton published at the Texas A&M University Press
Robert H. Barrow – came up with a cunning tactic that allow his marines to ambush/surprise and kill more than 50 enemy troops. Mentioned in U.S. Marines in the Korean War by Charles Richard Smith pages 203-204
Colonel John McGee
Tony Poe
Vincent R. Kramer
Charles George
Eugene F. Clark
Underwater Demolition Teams
Korean War Ranger Companies
JACK
CIA SAC
2nd Battalion, 1st Marines
Vietnam War
Rudy Boesch – operative in Seal Team 2 in Vietnam War
David Hackworth – involved in the creation and command of Tiger Force
Carlos Hathcock – United States Marine Corps Scout Sniper who has 93 confirmed kills
Tony Poe – legendary paramilitary officer in Vietnam from the CIA's Special Activities Division
Colt Terry – one of the original Green Berets whose successful unconventional type of warfare exploits are mentioned in his official biography Colt Terry, Green Beret written by Charles D. Patton published at the Texas A&M University Press.
Roy Boehm – first officer in charge of Seal Team two.
Richard J. Meadows
John Plaster
Richard Marcinko
Ira A. Hunt Jr.
George Bacon
Michael D. Healy
Billy Waugh
Harry Griffith Cramer Jr.
Thomas R. Norris
Robert J. Pruden
Arthur D. Simons
William Colby
Edward James Land
Chuck Mawhinney
Henry Kissinger – Campaign 139
Billy Walkabout
Laotian Civil War
George Bacon
James William Lair
Pat Landry
Bill Young
Tony Poe – legendary paramilitary officer in Vietnam from the CIA's Special Activities Division
Dick Holm
United States invasion of Grenada
Stephen Trujillo
Delta Force
SEAL Team Six
75th Ranger Regiment
United States Invasion of Panama
Larry Vickers
Eldon Bargewell
Gary L. Harrell
Peter Schoomaker
Delta Force
American Navy SEALs
American 7th SFG
War in Afghanistan
Matt Bissonnette
Brandon Webb
Robert J. O'Neill
Nicholas Irving
Edward Byers
Robert Harward
Francis J. Wiercinski – took part in a successful ambush wiping out nine enemy combatants while commanding his unit alongside a U.S. Special Operations Force team. Mentioned in A Different Kind of War: The US Army in Operation Enduring Freedom: October 2001 – September 2005 by Donald Wright pages 148–149.
Joseph Votel
Jonathan Idema – controversial American non commissioned reserve special operations vigilante.
Brent Bennett
Jason Amerine
Gary Berntsen
Gary Schroen
Jim Gant
Ann Scott Tyson
Marcus Luttrell
4th Brigade Combat Team, 82nd Airborne Division
2nd Ranger Battalion
3rd Ranger Battalion
26th Infantry Regiment
Delta Force
Seal Team 6
Iraq War
Kevin Lacz
Rorke Denver
Chris Kyle
Robert J. O'Neill
Carl Higbie – led the raid capturing the Butcher of Fallujah. Author of Enemies, Foreign & Domestic: A SEAL's Story and Battle on the Home Front.
Timothy Kellner
Ethan Place
Tyrone S. Woods 
Jocko Willink
Thomas Payne – took part in a successful commando raid that rescued 70 prisoners and killed 20 enemies in Operation Inherent Resolve.
Joshua Wheeler
Michael A. Monsoor
Jack Coughlin
162nd Infantry Regiment
Delta Force
Seal Team 6
Symbionese Liberation Army
Donald DeFreeze
Camilla Hall
Emily Harris
Patricia Soltysik
Willie Wolfe
Weather Underground
List of Weatherman members
Black Panther Party
Huey P. Newton
Others
Michael G. Vickers – legendary paramilitary officer in first Afghan war from the CIA's Special Activities Division
Touch the Clouds – Native American warrior
Orlando Bosch – Cuba, America and South America
Nat Turner – leader of slave rebellion
Daniel Boone – famous frontiersmen, Indian fighter, and American Revolutionary War hero.
Billy the Kid
Railroad Bill
Devil Anse Hatfield
James–Younger Gang
Jesse James
Cole Younger
Apache Kid – renegade Apache during the Renegade period of the Apache Wars
Pancho Villa
Queho
Robert Clay Allison
Ike Clanton
Billy Clanton
John Henry "Doc" Holliday
Dangerfield Newby
Daniel Shays
Denmark Vesey
Dan Seavey – also known as "Roaring" Dan Seavey" who was a notorious timber pirate involved in poaching, human trafficking, and hijacking etc.
Lewis Wetzel – scout, frontiersman, and Indian fighter
William Hardin – American Revolutionary War soldier, farmer, rancher, marksman, hunter, and Native American killer
John L. Bullis
James Smith
Grayston Lynch
Edward Lansdale
Frederick Russell Burnham

Uruguay
 Pepe Mujica
 Raúl Sendic - during the 1960s and '70s in Uruguay

V

Venezuela
Gustavo Machado Morales - founder of the Communist Party of Venezuela
Rafael Simón Urbina - Venezuelan rebel who waged a guerrilla insurgency against the dictator Juan Vicente Gómez 
José Dionisio Cisneros
José Manuel Hernández
Rafael de Nogales
Douglas Bravo
Carlos the Jackal
Teodoro Petkoff
Narciso Lopez
Olga Luzardo
Fabricio Ojeda
Paul del Rio

Vietnam
Ho Chi Minh
Võ Nguyên Giáp
Triệu Việt Vương

W

Western Sahara
Ma al-'Aynayn
El-Ouali Mustapha Sayed
Mohamed Abdelaziz
Brahim Gali

Y

Yugoslavia
Draža Mihailović
Josip Broz Tito

Z

Zimbabwe
Joshua Nkomo
Robert Mugabe

References

External links
 US Civil War guerrillas List of United States Civil War guerrillas
 
Guerrillas